MedStar Montgomery Medical Center, formerly known as Montgomery General Hospital, is a large hospital in Olney, Maryland. The hospital is a member of MedStar Health.

History 
In 1909, Dr. Jacob Wheeler Bird arrived in Sandy Spring to begin a medical practice and set out to establish the only hospital in Montgomery County. In 1919, eight women, who met to roll bandages and sew for community organizations, turned their energies toward raising funds for the new hospital.

Founded by Dr. Bird, the hospital opened in February 1920.  Still unfinished, Montgomery General Hospital admitted its first 5 patients during a blizzard and the Spanish flu epidemic. The original hospital had 28 beds and admitted 596 patients its first year.

References

External links 
 Official website
 ACHS Summary Form - Maryland State Archives

Hospitals in Maryland
Olney, Maryland